Charles Fotherby (c. 1549 – 1619) was a Church of England clergyman who became Dean of Canterbury (1615–1619).

Life

Fotherby's date of birth is not recorded but he is stated to have been 70 when he died. 
His father was Martin Fotherby of Great Grimsby in Lincolnshire. His younger brother, Dr Martin Fotherby (c.1560-1620), was also a prebendary of Canterbury, and later bishop of Salisbury.

He studied at Trinity College, Cambridge (sizar 1573, scholar 1575, B.A. 1576/77, M.A. 1580, B.D. 1587). He became a fellow of Trinity in 1579. He was vicar of several Kentish parishes and became Archdeacon of Canterbury and a prebendary of the Canterbury Cathedral in 1595 and Dean of Canterbury in 1615.

He married Cecilia Walker of Cambridge, by whom he had ten children, but only his eldest son, 
John, and four daughters survived him.

He died in 1619 and was buried in the Lady Chapel at Canterbury Cathedral. His monument is described as 'a bone-encrusted tomb-chest [which] is a fine example of that obsessive early seventeenth-century morbidity which repelled later, more squeamish observers'.

As Dean, he is recorded as reinvigorating the musical life of the Cathedral.

Career

References

16th-century English Anglican priests
17th-century English Anglican priests
Archdeacons of Canterbury
Deans of Canterbury
Alumni of Trinity College, Cambridge
Fellows of Trinity College, Cambridge
1540s births
1619 deaths